BalletCollective is a New York based Non-Profit  arts collective that connects artists, composers, and choreographers to create new, ballet-based works. Through its unique collaborative process, Balletcollective expands the boundaries of artistic disciplines in a way that resonates with a wide audience by founder and artistic director Troy Schumacher. Founded in 2010, BalletCollective has collaborated with a roster of over 50 acclaimed artists, choreographers, composers, musicians, designers, and dancers. BalletCollective has been presented by the Metropolitan Museum of Art, Joyce Theater, NYU Skirball Center, Guggenheim Works & Process, Guggenheim Bilbao, the Fire Island Dance Festival, and the Savannah Music Festival

Each BalletCollective project takes as its source a contemporary work of art in any medium chosen or commissioned by its choreographer and composer. From this starting point, the choreographer and composer collaborate to create a work that interprets, explores, or responds to its source. The result of the collaboration is performed live. By its nature, BalletCollective consists of a rotating group of artists and collaborators, and with each new collective there are new ideas, new challenges, and, ultimately, new forms of expression emerge.

In the midst of the Covid-19 pandemic, BalletCollective commissioned. produced and safely performed live both the first world-premiere one-act ballet, Natural History, and the first full-length world premiere ballet, The Nutcracker at Wethersfield, in the US

Contributing Artists

Troy Schumacher, Choreographer
Gabrielle Lamb, Choreographer
Preston Chamblee, Choreographer
Bryn Cohn, Choreographer
Augusta Read Thomas, Composer
Alex Somers, Composer
Judd Greenstein, Composer
Paul Moravec, Composer
Mark Danciger, Composer
Ellis Ludwig-Leone, Composer
Caleb Burhans, Composer
Julianna Barwick, Composer
Olafur Eliasson, Artist
Douglas Fitch, Source Artist
Zaria Forman, Source Artist
David Salle, Source Artist
Cynthia Zarin, Source Artist
Carlos Arnaiz, Source Artist
Sergio Mora Diaz, Source Artist
Dafy Hagai, Source Artist 
George Steinmetz, Source Artist
Ken Liu, Source Artist
Paul Maffi, Source Artist 
Carey Mchugh, Source Artist
James Ramsey, Source Artist
Karen Russel, Source Artist
Trevor Paglen, Source Artist
Brandon Stirling Baker, Lighting Designer
Ben Rawson, Lighting Designer
John Cuff, Lighting Designer
Karen Young, Costume Designer

Repertoire 
The Nutcracker at Wethersfield (2020)

An immersive, one-of-a-kind production of the holiday classic where the audience becomes part of the story. 60 minutes. 22 dancers. Music by Tchaikovsky. Featured in The New York Times, New York Magazine, Cosmopolitan, Vogue, The Wall Street Journal, The Dancing Times, The New Yorker, Pointe Magazine and more.

Natural History (2020)

22 minutes. 7 dancers. Chamber ensemble. Music by Ellis Ludwig-Leone. Source poem by Carey McHugh. Costumes by Karen Young.

Natural History was the first one-act ballet to premiere live in the US during the Covid-19 pandemic.

Faraway (2019)

(2019) 30 minutes. 8 dancers. Chamber Orchestra. Music by Judd Greenstein. Source art by Zaria Forman. Costumes by Karen Young. Stage design by Jason Ardizzone West. Lighting by John Cuff.

Scorpio Desert (2019)

15 minutes. 7 dancers. Chamber orchestra. Music by Paul Moravec. Source art by George Steinmetz. Costumes styled by Melinette Rodriguez.

Translation (2017)

33 minutes. 6 dancers. Music by Julianna Barwick. Choreography by Troy Schumacher. Installation by Sergio Mora-Diaz. Costumes by Outdoor Voices. Source writing by Ken Liu.

Orange (2017)

10 minutes. 5 dancers. Music by Caleb Burhans. Choreography by Gabrielle Lamb. Source art by Trevor Paglen.

The Answer (2016)

6 minutes. 2 dancers. Music Judd Greenstein. Choreography by Troy Schumacher. Source art by architect Carlos Arnaiz.

Until the Walls Came In (2016)

25 minutes. 7 dancers. Music by Ellis Ludwig-Leone. Choreography by Troy Schumacher. Source art by architect James Ramsey.

Invisible Divide (2015)

25 minutes. 7 dancers. Music by Ellis Ludwig-Leone. Choreography by Troy Schumacher. Source art by Paul Maffi.

The Last Time This Ended (2015)

8 minutes. 2 dancers. Music by Mark Dancigers. Choreography by Troy Schumacher. Source art by Dafy Hagai.

All That We See (2015)

9 minutes. 2 dancers. Music by Ellis Ludwig-Leone. Choreography by Troy Schumacher. Inspired by a poem by Cynthia Zarin.

Dear Blackbird (2014)

9 minutes. 2 dancers. Music by Ellis Ludwig-Leone. Choreography by Troy Schumacher. Inspired by a poem by Cynthia Zarin.

The Impulse Wants Company (2013)

22 minutes. 7 dancers. Music by Ellis Ludwig-Leone. Inspired by a poem by Cynthia Zarin.

Warehouse Under The Hudson (2012)

7 dancers. Music by Nick Jaina, Nathan Langston, Amanda Lawrence, David Moss. Choreography by Troy Schumacher. Source art by Kevin Draper, Lora Robertson. Lighting by Brandon Stirling Baker. Costumes by Michele Reneau.

Epistasis (2011)

6 dancers. Music by Nick Jaina, Nathan Langston, Amanda Lawrence. Choreography by Troy Schumacher. Source art by Kevin Draper. Lighting by Brandon Stirling Baker

Progress (2011)

6 dancers. Music by Nick Jaina, Nathan Langston, Amanda Lawrence. Choreography by Troy Schumacher. Source art by Kevin Draper. Costumes by Teresa Reichlen. Lighting by Brandon Stirling Baker

Dancers 
Aaron Sanz, Anthony Huxley, Ashley Laracey, Ashly Isaacs, Ava Sautter, Cainan Weber, Claire Kretzschmar, Claire Von Enck, Daniel Applebaum, David Prottas, Davide Riccardo, Devin Alberda, Eliza Blutt, Emilie Gerrity, Emma Von Enck, Gabriella Domini, Graham Feeny, Haley Winegarden, Harrison Coll, India Bradley, Isabella LaFreniere, Jada German, Julio Bragado-Young, Kaitlyn Gililand, KJ Takahashi, Kristen Segin, Lauren King, Lauren Lovette, Leslie Andrea Williams, Lorenzo Pagano, Lydia Wellington, Malorie Lundgren, Marika Anderson, Mary Elizabeth Sell, Mary Thomas MacKinnon, Maxwell Simoes, Meagan Mann, Megan LeCrone, Mimi Staker, Mira Nadon, Miriam Miller, Preston Chamblee, Rachel Hutsell, Ralph Ippolito, Samuel Greenberg, Sara Mearns, Sasonah Huttenbach, Savannah Durham, Sean Suozzi, Shelby Mann, Taylor Stanley, Teresa Reichlen, Tyler Angle, Zoe Liebold.

References

Ballet companies in the United States
Non-profit organizations based in New York City
Arts organizations based in New York City
Dance in New York City
Arts organizations established in 2010
2010 establishments in New York City